

Ernest Scott Prize
The pre-eminent prize for "original published research that contributes to the history of Australia or New Zealand or to the history of colonisation in these countries." Awarded since 1943, the prize is named in honor of Ernest Scott, regarded as the first historian of Australian historiography, and was endowed by his wife, Emily Scott. The winner is announced each year at the Kathleen Fitzpatrick Lecture, awarded a prize of $13,000 and invited to give the Ernest Scott Lecture at the University of Melbourne. Applicants must be publishers and the work must have been published in the preceding two calendar years. Winners must "live in Australia or New Zealand or the respective external territories [of either country]." There are two judges. 

The prize is typically awarded to one historical writer, although it has been shared between two people and two books nine times. Seven people have won the Ernest Scott Prize twice, including one person who won the prize for two books in the same year (1959). One historian, Alan Atkinson, won the prize three times. The prize has been won by 35 men and 13 women historians, and three non-white historians.

Numerous winners of the prize are part of the Scott lineage, a teacher-undergraduate student chain of historians stretching back to Scott himself. Among the future prize winners Scott taught were Manning Clark, W. K. Hancock and Geoffrey Serle; Clark taught Weston Bate, Ken Inglis, Geoffrey Blainey and Graeme Davison; Blainey taught Janet McCalman and Stuart Macintyre.

The Allan Martin Award
This biennial award has been named for A. W. Martin (1926–2002) and is administered jointly by the Australian National University and the Australian Historical Association.  The award is to encourage "early career historians" for work relating to Australian History.  Submissions for this award are those prepared for publication and can be in any form, e.g. a monograph, a series of academic articles, an exhibition or documentary film, or some mix of these. Seven women and six men have won the prize, with one non-white winner.

Blackwell AHA Prize

The publishers, Blackwell Publishing Asia, have sponsored a prize for the best postgraduate paper at a Regional Conference.

The AHA information states that the "prize will be judged on two criteria: 1) oral presentation of the paper 2) written version of the conference paper. The written version of the conference paper (not a longer version) is to be submitted at the start of the conference. The winner of the prize will be announced at the close of the conference."

 2007 Winners
 Melissa Bellanta (University of Sydney) for Raiders of the Lost Civilisation, or, Adventure-Romances of the Australian Desert, 1890-1907, and
 Nell Musgrove (University of Melbourne) for Private Homes, Public Scrutiny: Surveillance of 'the family' in postwar Melbourne

WK Hancock Prize

The WK Hancock Prize is run by Australian Historical Association (AHA) with the Department of Modern History, Macquarie University.  It was instituted in 1987 in honour of Sir Keith Hancock and his life achievements.

The award is for the first book of history by an Australian scholar and for research using original sources.  It is awarded biennially for a first book published in the preceding two years with the award presented at the AHA's National Biennial Conference.

 2004 Winners
 Mary Anne Jebb for Blood, Sweat and Welfare: a History of White Bosses and Aboriginal Pastoral Workers (UWA Press, 2002)citation
 Warwick Anderson for The Cultivation of Whiteness: Science, Health and Racial Destiny in Australia (Melbourne University Press, 2002)
 Highly Commended
 John Connor for The Australian Frontier Wars: 1788-1838 (University of New South Wales Press)
 Brigid Hains for The Ice and the Inland: Mawson, Flynn, and the Myth of the Frontier (Melbourne University Press)

 2006 Winner Tony Roberts for Frontier Justice: A History of the Gulf Country to 1900 (UQP, 2005)
 Highly Commended
 Maria Nugent for Botany Bay: Where Histories Meet (Allen & Unwin, 2005)
 Sue Taffe for Black and White Together, FCAATSI 1958-1972 (UQP, 2005)

 2008 Winner: 
Robert Kenny for The Lamb enters the Dreaming: Nathaniel Pepper and the Ruptured World (Scribe Publications, 2007)
2008 Highly Commended
 Tracey Banivanua-Mar for Violence and Colonial Dialogue: The Australian-Pacific Indentured Labor Trade (University of Hawaii Press, 2007)

 2010 Winner: 
 Dr Natasha Campo for From Superwomen to Domestic Goddesses: the rise and fall of Feminism Peter Lang, 2009
2010 Commendation
 Dr Clare Corbould for Becoming African Americans" Black Public Life in Harlem, 1919-1939 Harvard University Press, 2009

2012 Joint Winners
Frances M Clarke for War Stories: Suffering and Sacrifice in the Civil War North

Ian Coller for Arab France: Islam and the Making of Modern Europe, 1798-1831

2012 Commendation
 Michael L. Ondaatje for Black Conservative Intellectuals in Modern America

 2014 Winner: 
Janet Butler for Kitty’s War: The Remarkable Wartime Experiences of Kit McNaughton (University of Queensland Press, 2013)

 2016 Winner:
Adam Clulow for The Company and The Shogun: The Dutch Encounter with Tokugawa Japan (Columbia University Press, 2014)
2016 Highly Commended
 Ruth Morgan for Running Out? Water in Western Australia (UWA Publishing, 2015)
 2018 Winner:

 Miranda Johnson for The Land Is Our History: Indigeneity, Law, and the Settler State (Oxford University Press)

 2020 Winner:

Laura Rademaker for Found in Translation: Many Meanings on a North Australian Mission (University of Hawai’i Press)

The Jill Roe Prize

The Jill Roe Prize is awarded annually to a postgraduate student for the best unpublished article of historical research. It was inaugurated in 2014 in honour of the late Jill Roe.

 2014: Chris Holdridge for The Pageantry of the Anti-Convict Cause: Colonial Loyalism and Settler Celebrations in Tasmania and Cape Colony (published in History Australia 12, No. 1, April 2015).
 2015: No prize awarded.
 2016: James H. Dunk for The Liability of Colonial Madness: Jonathan Burke Hugo in Port Dalrymple, Sydney and Calcutta, 1812.
 2017: James Findlay for Cinematic Landscapes, Dark Tourism and the Ghosts of Port Arthur.
 2019: No prize awarded.
 2020: Karen Twigg, Dust, dryness and departure: constructions of masculinity and femininity during the WWII drought.
 2021: Jessica Urwin, "The old colonial power can stand proxy": The Royal Commission into British Nuclear Tests in Australia and the politics of the 1980s
 2022: Catherine Gay, All the perils of the ocean: Girls' emotions on voyages to Australia, 1851–1884.

The John Barrett Award for Australian Studies
The John Barrett Award for Australian Studies is for the best written article published in the Journal of Australian Studies, in the categories: the best article by a scholar (open) and the best article by a scholar (post-graduate).

John Barrett Award: Open Category
 2014: Nathan Garvey for ‘“Folkalising” Convicts: a “Botany Bay” Ballad and its Cultural Contexts’, JAS, Vol.38 No.1 (March) (2014): 32–51
 2014 Highly Commended: Mark McKenna for Tokenism or belated recognition? Welcome to Country and the Emergence of Indigenous Protocol in Australia, 1991–2004 JAS, Vol.38 No.4 (December) (2014): 476–89 
 2013: Lyndall Ryan. 'The Black Line in Van Diemen’s Land (Tasmania), 1830', JAS, 37:1 (2013):  3-18.
 2012: Zoe Anderson, 'Borders, babies and ‘good refugees’: Australian representations of ‘illegal’ immigration, 1979', JAS, 36:4 (2012): 499-514.

John Barrett Award: Postgraduate Category
 2013:  Not awarded.
 2012:  Jessica Neath, 'Empty lands: contemporary art approaches to photographing historical trauma in Tasmania', JAS 36:3 (2012): 309-325.

The Kay Daniels Award

Inaugurated in 2004, this award is named for Kay Daniels (1941–2001), historian and public servant, and recognises her interest in colonial and heritage history.

The biennial award will be administered by The Australian Historical Association.

 2004: Lucy Frost and Hamish Maxwell-Stuart (eds) for Chain Letters: Narrating Convict Lives (Melbourne University Press)
 2006: Trudy Mae Cowley for A Drift of 'Derwent Ducks: Lives of the 200 Female Irish Convicts Transported on the Australasia from Dublin to Hobart in 1849 (Research Tasmania, Hobart, 2005)Review
 2008: Kirsty Reid for Gender, Crime and Empire: Convicts, Settlers and the State in Early Colonial Australia
 2010: Hamish Maxwell-Stuart for Closing Hell's Gates: the Death of a Convict Station (Allen & Unwin 2008)
 2014: Kristyn Harman for Aboriginal Convicts: Australian, Khoisan and Maori Exiles,(UNSW Press 2012)
 2016: Sue Castrique for Under the Colony’s Eye: Gentlemen and Convicts on Cockatoo Island 1839–1869 (Anchor Books Australia, 2014)
 2018: Joan Kavanagh and Dianne Snowden for Van Diemen’s Women: A History of Transportation to Tasmania (The History Press Ltd).
 2020: Hilary Carey for Empire of Hell. Religion and the Campaign to End Convict Transportation in the British Empire, 1788–1875 (Cambridge University Press, 2019)
 2022: Bill Bell for Crusoe’s Books: Readers in the Empire of Print 1800-1918 (Oxford University Press)

The Serle Award

The Serle Award was first presented in 2002.  The award was established through the generosity of Mrs Jessie Serle for the historian Geoffrey Serle (1922–1998).

The Serle Award is for the best thesis by an "early career researcher" and will be payable on receipt of publisher’s proofs, which must be within twelve months of notification of the award. The biennial award will be administered by The Australian Historical Association.

See also
 New South Wales Premier's History Awards
 List of Australian literary awards
 List of history awards
 Victorian Community History Awards
 Northern Territory History Awards
 Prime Minister's Prize for Australian History
 Magarey Medal for biography

Notes

External links
 The Australian Historical Association
 AHA Prizes and Awards

Australia history-related lists
Australian non-fiction book awards
History awards